George Maxwell Wilson (August 7, 1913 – ?
1990) was a businessman and politician in Newfoundland. He represented Port de Grave in the Newfoundland House of Assembly from 1972 to 1975.

The son of William Wilson and Emily Stevens, he was born in South River and was educated there. He established a hardware, lumbering and construction company in Clarke's Beach. He served on the town council and also was town mayor.

In 1938, he married Muriel Jane Babcock.

Wilson was elected to the Newfoundland assembly in 1972 but was defeated when he ran for reelection in 1975.

References 

1913 births
1990 deaths
Year of death uncertain
Progressive Conservative Party of Newfoundland and Labrador MHAs
Mayors of places in Newfoundland and Labrador